Frank Carmichael (born c. 1887) was a trapper and a territorial level politician in the Northwest Territories, Canada.

Early life
Carmichael moved to Aklavik, Northwest Territories in 1927 and began working as a trapper.

Political career
Carmichael began his political career when he ran for a seat on the Northwest Territories Council in the 1951 Northwest Territories general election becoming one of the three elected members of the 1st Northwest Territories Legislative Council. He won the new electoral district of Mackenzie West defeating Vivian Roberts, the first woman candidate in Northwest Territories history, and Karl Helmer Walter Gardlund by a wide margin in a high-profile race. His electoral district was abolished due to redistribution in 1954 and he ran in and won the new Mackenzie Delta in the 1954 Northwest Territories general election. He served out his second term and did not return when the Legislature was dissolved in 1957.

References

External links
1951 election, Northwest Territories Hansard September 17, 1998

|-

Members of the Legislative Assembly of the Northwest Territories
People from Aklavik